Mary Mbewe is a Zambian journalist. She is executive editor of the Daily Nation, and the first woman to serve as editor-in-chief of a major newspaper in Zambia. In 2020 the World Association of News Publishers awarded her the Women in News (WIN) Editorial Leadership Award for Africa.

Life
Mwebe started as a journalist in 1991, working at the Zambia Daily Mail. In 2000 she became editor-in-chief of the Daily Mail, the first woman editor-in-chief in Zambia.

In May 2017 she joined the Daily Nation as executive editor.

Mwebe was a founder member of the Zambia Union of Journalists (ZUJ). She is a member of the Zambia Media Women Association (ZAMWA) and the Zambian Chapter of the Media Institute of Southern Africa (MISA).

References

Zambian journalists
Zambian women journalists
African newspaper editors
Women newspaper editors
Year of birth missing (living people)
Living people